The Sehol X6 is a compact crossover produced by JAC Motors under the Sehol brand. The Sehol X6 was originally planned to be named the Sehol X5 during early development, and was based on the same platform as the JAC Refine S5 while being updated for the Sehol brand featuring a completely different design. Being also a compact crossover, the Sehol X6 was positioned lower than the Sehol QX or globally the JAC JS6 and above the Sehol X4.

Overview
Despite press images being released in late 2021, the Sehol X6 was officially unveiled to the Mainland Chinese market for the 2022 Beijing Auto Show. Just like the majority of Sehol's product lineup at the time, the Sehol X6 is heavily based on previous JAC vehicles and features a front fascia design that stands out from the rest of the Sehol vehicle range.

Powertrain
The Sehol X6 is equipped with a 1.5 liter four-cylinder turbocharged engine shared with the Sehol X4. The maximum power is 150 horsepower and the peak torque is 210 Nm.

References

External links
Sehol official website

Sehol X6
Compact sport utility vehicles
Crossover sport utility vehicles
Front-wheel-drive vehicles
Cars introduced in 2022